Harold Edward Winch (18 June 1907 – 1 February 1993) was a Canadian politician active with the Co-operative Commonwealth Federation (CCF) and its successor, the New Democratic Party (NDP).

Winch was leader of the British Columbia CCF from 1938 to 1953, and Leader of the Opposition from 1941. He was called "the best leader of the Opposition that has ever been" by Premier W. A. C. Bennett.

Winch was active during the relief camp strike in Vancouver that precipitated the On-to-Ottawa Trek in 1935, acting as a liaison between unemployed protesters and the government. He performed the same role as a new MLA in 1938, and assisted the police in ending a month-long occupation at the Vancouver Art Gallery on what became known as "Bloody Sunday".

Like other CCFers (such as Grace and Angus MacInnis), Winch and the BC CCF supported the internment of Japanese Canadians during World War II. Decades later, he conceded that this position was wrong. 

An electrician by trade, Winch joined the CCF at its founding. He  was first elected to the British Columbia Legislative Assembly in the 1933 provincial election as the Member of the Legislative Assembly (MLA) for Vancouver East. He became leader of the party following the 1937 general election and leader of the opposition in 1941. The CCF emerged from the 1952 provincial election with only one less seat than the British Columbia Social Credit Party. Social Credit formed a minority government, but was defeated in a motion of no confidence in March 1953. Winch opposed holding a new election, arguing that the CCF was able to form a new government. When the Liberal Party announced that it would not support a CCF government, a new election was called.

Winch stepped down as party leader, and entered federal politics. He was elected to the House of Commons of Canada in the 1953 federal election as the Member of Parliament for Vancouver East.

Winch survived the 1958 federal election that almost wiped the CCF out, and remained with the party as it transformed into the New Democratic Party in 1961. After winning seven successive elections as an MP, he retired from the House of Commons at the 1972 federal election.

Harold Winch's father, Ernest Edward Winch was also a CCF MLA from 1933 until his death in 1957.

References

External links
 

1907 births
1993 deaths
English emigrants to Canada
Co-operative Commonwealth Federation MPs
Members of the House of Commons of Canada from British Columbia
British Columbia Co-operative Commonwealth Federation MLAs
20th-century Canadian politicians
Canadian socialists
Canadian people of Australian descent
Leaders of the British Columbia CCF/NDP
People from Loughton